This artist uses Zardonic as one of his stage names. You may be looking for the word Sardonic.Federico Augusto Ágreda Álvarez, best known as Zardonic, is a Venezuelan keyboardist, DJ, composer, producer and remixer primarily known for his heavy electronic dance music, dubbed as Venezuela's top DJ act and one of the Top 10 best DJ masks in the world, with releases peaking at #1 in Beatport's Drum & Bass releases of the week and Amazon's Hard Rock & Metal Bestsellers. He is also featured in the game Warlocks Vs Shadows, making him the first Latin American musician to be ever featured as a playable character in a video game. A remix with Mikey Rukus to his original Revelation was used as the theme song of the All Elite Wrestling pay-per-view Revolution in 2020.

Since 2004, his tour history includes headlining events in 40 countries.

Some of his known tracks include "Bring Back The Glory" with Voicians, his remix of Semargl's "Credo Revolution" and his remix of The Unguided's "Phoenix Down". Other remix credits include Bullet For My Valentine, Fear Factory, Blitz Union, Sonic Syndicate, Dreamshade and more.

Biography
Before Zardonic (2001-2003)
Federico's earlier projects include Venezuelan black metal project Gorepriest. With the release of War Against Humanity: The Armageddon Chronicles, he was awarded the Best Keyboardist category in the Premios Metal Hecho en Venezuela 2002–2003.

Early Zardonic career (2004–2005)
Federico's first tracks as Zardonic were composed in 2004 and 2005, respectively in the albums Subsonic Stigmata and Red Phasing, made available through VeNet Music Development, a netlabel which released most of his early works. His remix of Impaled's track Gutless was also freely released this year on the band's website.

First international events and worldwide releases (2006–2008)
In 2006 Zardonic's first vinyl was released through Death Brigade Records, becoming the first Venezuelan drum and bass producer to release a single in an international imprint. Later this year, he also founded Zardonic Recordings, an independent drum and bass netlabel. His remix of Avulsed's track Stabwound Orgasm was included on their compilation album entitled Reanimations and a remix of Gorgoroth's track Procreating Satan was freely released through the band's website.

In 2007 he was booked for his first international event in Mexico on 19 May. Months later AK1200, pioneer of the American Drum & Bass scene, selected Zardonic's Moonlight Ceremony for his Weapons of Tomorrow mixed compilation CD. Soon after, his tunes earned the support of international performers such as Dieselboy, Pendulum and John B.

In 2008, his remix of The Berzerker's Caught In The Crossfire was featured on the Digipak edition of the band's album The Reawakening. In December, he was featured in the Venezuela Electrónica Vol. 3 compilation, sponsored by Venezuelan wireless telecommunications company Digitel GSM and Motorola, by selling the new MOTOROKR EM30 mobile phone model together with a microSD card including all the tracks.

Policia, Human Imprint, European Tour (2009–2011)
2009 marked the release of his track Policia, featuring James Messinian on vocals, through American label Cymbalism Recordings, becoming his first worldwide dancefloor hit, played by globetrotters like Andy C and DJ Hype. Soon after, Big Riddim Recordings released Zardonic's remix of AK1200's classic Junior's Tune,. In a Dieselboy interview for Broken Beats on May 8, Zardonic was named as one of the five outstanding artists in Drum & Bass at the time.

In 2010, Zardonic toured Europe compiling a total of 12 gigs in Spain, Austria, Romania and Bulgaria. Shortly after, his studio mix Retaliation was released on drum and bass web site Dogsonacid.com paired with an in-depth interview. The first Human Imprint release also happened this year, entitled South Of Human EP. Later on, he headlined two Therapy Sessions events in Ecuador and Argentina, as well as more gigs in Colombia and Venezuela.

In 2011, his track "Scream!" was picked as part of the Trackitdown.Net One For The Weekend – 15th July 2011–50 Of The Biggest Recommendations For Your Mix bundle, together with tracks from artists like Paul Oakenfold, Lazy Rich, Darth & Vader, Teebee, Scott Brown, and many more. The social networking website VampireFreaks.com released a free compilation with a total of 36 rare tracks by various artists including KMFDM, Suicide Commando and Left Spine Down, as well as Zardonic's mix of the track "Ready Or Not" by the latter.

Vulgar Display Of Bass, Revolution and stage show costume (2012)
In 2012, Zardonic announced the release of a Full Length collaboration album entitled Vulgar Display Of Bass on March 26 through Big Riddim Recordings, paired with a European tour for April and May. Highly acclaimed upon release, the album reached #1 on the Top Drum & Bass releases on leading online music store Beatport. An official video for the opening track Revolution was produced and made public through video hosting network YouTube on April 10. The video consisted of a collage of crowd-based footage showing their country flags, with a total of 46 countries participating.

The artist also revealed a new set of pictures wearing a mask based on the Zardonic logo, as a part of his stage show to be seen on Dimmu Borgir's concert in Caracas as the opening act for the band. Four of his new tracks were included again on Dieselboy's new mixtape for the year entitled Wake The Dead and a new collaboration track with UK dubstep duo Bare Noize''' was included on a compilation album to be released on March 13 by Owsla, a label helmed by the 3-time Grammy winner Skrillex.

Later in the year, Zardonic celebrated his Latin American Tour 2012 with 26 stops in Venezuela, Colombia, Ecuador, Brasil, Argentina, Chile, Panama, Costa Rica, Honduras, Guatemala and Mexico, as well as headlining the Halloween Revolution event held in Tokyo, Japan.

Far Beyond Bass – The Vulgar Remixes (2013)
A remix album to the original Vulgar Display Of Bass was released on June 17, including a total of 12 reworks by Eye-D, Counterstrike, ANiMAL-MUSiC, Raptus, Neonlight, Black Sun Empire, State Of Mind, Angel, Gancher & Ruin, C-Netik & Fragz, Hectic Mau, Delta 9, Fiend and Hecq. New shows were celebrated in Belgium, Austria, Mexico, Guatemala and El Salvador; followed by the announcement of the Europa Beyond Bass Tour 2013 with 18 stops in Portugal, France, Austria, Czech Republic, Italy and Russia.

10th Anniversary, For Justice (2014)
Celebrating its 10th Anniversary, an exclusive mix was released via YourEDM.com paired with an in-depth interview.

On March 25 his electro remix of the Main Theme of the Xbox / PS4 game Strike Suit Zero, featuring Japanese Pop Star KOKIA, was released as part of a compilation of remixes of tracks from the game as originally produced by award-winning sound designer and composer Paul Ruskay.

On May 13, Zardonic is endorsed by Image-Line and joins the FL Studio power user family.

Later on, an exclusive record deal was signed with eOne Music for the new single "For Justice", released in December. The single was reviewed as "a single that not only blends the best of both worlds, but does it in a highly polished and flawlessly produced way" by Intravenous Magazine and "a track that deserves the repeat button for a never-ending roller coaster night ride" by 24OurMusic. "For Justice" premiered on National U.S. radio on Amber Lynn's Talk Show Rock N Sexxxy Uncensored during a feature show together with Ron Jeremy.

 Bring It On, Europe Tour, Warlocks vs Shadows, Antihero, Best DJ Award (2015) 
The Bring It On single is chosen as the main track in World Series Of Fighting on NBC Sports Network and is later released by eOne Music, which led to a guest performance at World Series of Fighting 22: Palhares vs. Shields.

Between April and July, Zardonic tours Europe with 20 stops in Portugal, Netherlands, France, Spain, Italy, Slovakia, Hungary, Czech Republic, Estonia, Poland and Romania. As a result of a collaboration with polish company One More Level, Zardonic appears as a playable character in the Warlocks vs Shadows game for which he created his own sound effects and contributed with the tracks Kickass and Sideshow Symphony, taken from the album Vulgar Display Of Bass.

The new album Antihero is released on Entertainment One Music on September 18, 2015, totaling a compilation of 26 tracks including 11 original mixes, 6 instrumental mixes and 9 remixes spanning all styles and different EDM genres. Antihero peaked at #4 in Tower Records Japan Hard & Heavy chart and #5 in the Western chart.

In the Fifth Edition of the Unión Rock Show Awards held in Venezuela, Zardonic was nominated as Best DJ and Personality Of The Year, being awarded with the Best DJ category.

 World Tour, Huffington Post premiere, Artist Of The Year Award (2016) 
Following the success of the Antihero release, Zardonic toured a total of 28 dates in 18 countries for his 2016 World Tour. Highlights of the tour include the Loud Park Festival held annually in Japan at the Saitama Super Arena; and Baroeg Open Air in the Netherlands with Caliban, Discharge, Arkona, Counterstrike and many more. Several video captures of his tour and previous events can be seen in the official video of the single Pure Power, premiered on The Huffington Post.

For the Sixth Edition of the Unión Rock Show Awards, Zardonic was nominated as Best DJ and Artist Of The Year, with his 2015 album Antihero nominated for Best Album Cover and Album Of The Year. He was awarded with the Artist Of The Year category.

His 2016 releases include several remixes for artists like Sonic Syndicate, The Qemists, Celldweller, Richy Nix, Xmas Eileen, Damage Inc, Heavygrinder and Earbutter.

Discography (incomplete)
as Zardonic
 2006: Inherit Single
 2006: Driveburner Single
 2006: Her Lust For Blood / Scourge EP
 2007: Seizure Of Iniquity Single
 2007: House Of Sorrow / Moonlight Ceremony EP
 2008: Solaris Single
 2008: Acid Industries / Reliquia / Braindrainer EP
 2008: Neurotica (with Identity) / Natural Born Killers (with Malsum) EP
 2008: Ashtray Single
 2008: Shrapnel Of Fear Single
 2008: Bloodforged EP
 2008: Chaotic Serenity EP
 2008: Zen (with Claw) Single
 2008: Relentless Beating Single
 2008: Halfbeaten / Nightcrawler EP
 2008: Subcultonegro Studio Mix
 2009: Zeichen (with Mocks) Single
 2009: Those Who Know The Truth EP
 2009: Policia (with James Messinian) / Fresh Meat Single
 2009: Stop The Suffering (with Alcrani) / Alerte Rouge (with Peter Kurten) EP
 2009: The Law Single
 2009: Subliminal (with Hedj) Single
 2009: The Sound Of Inevitability Studio Mix
 2010: F***ing Up The Program (with Brainpain) Single
 2010: Dreams (with Syze) / Dead Miracles Single
 2010: My Prey (with Syze) / Frozen Pathways VIP Single
 2010: Retaliation Studio Mix
 2010: Lovecraft Machine EP
 2010: South Of Human EP
 2010: Ten Commandments (with Replicator) Single
 2011: The Brink Of Apocalypso Studio Mix
 2011: When Worlds Collide (with Counterstrike)
 2011: Reptile (with Dextems) / The Last Invocation (with Susiah)
 2011: Biohazard (with Davip) / Scream! (with Gancher and Jae Kennedy)
 2011: El Sistema EP
 2011: The End Of Days EP
 2012: Subliminal (with Hedj) / Paranoia (Remix) Single
 2012: Without You (with Krusha) Single
 2012: Vulgar Display Of Bass Album
 2012: Bad Medicine (with NumberNin6) EP
 2013: Far Beyond Bass – The Vulgar Remixes Album
 2013: When All The Seraphim Cry" (with The Unguided) Single
 2013: Restless Remixes EP
 2014: For Justice Single
 2015: Bring It On Single
 2015: Antihero Album
 2018: Become Album

as Sol Nocturno
 2010: Caos Cósmico Full Length

as Triangular Ascension
 2009: Microcosmogenesis EP
 2010: Nibirusalem EP
 2011: Sexta Repvblica EP
 2011: Leviathan Device Full Length
 2012: The Chronos Anomaly Full Length

as Blackholepit
 2008: Portals Full Length

as Intimus Universum
 2002: Astral Chambers Full Length
 2003: Soulnatomy Full Length
 2004: Astral Chambers Pt. 2: Beyond The Astral Abyss Full Length
 2008: White Landscapes Of Darkness Full Length

as Gorepriest
 2002: Beneath Eternal Oceans Of Melancholy Demo
 2003: War Against Humanity: The Armageddon Chronicles Full Length
 2004: Perpetual Horizons Full Length
 2004: Thanatologica Full Length

See also
 Human Imprint
 History of drum and bass

References

External links

 
 Zardonic Discography at Rolldabeats
 Zardonic Discography at Discogs
 Zardonic at NIN Remix Site

Living people
Drum and bass musicians
Venezuelan DJs
Remixers
Venezuelan musicians
1985 births
Masked musicians
Electronic dance music DJs
Venezuelan electronic musicians
FL Studio users